is a Japanese professional baseball outfielder for the Hanshin Tigers in Japan's Nippon Professional Baseball.

Early Baseball Career
Born in Tokyo, Shintaro is the son of Masashi Yokota, a former outfielder for the Lotte Orions (now Chiba Lotte Marines). His family migrated to Kagoshima when he was 3, and he started playing softball in third grade all the way to junior high.

He entered Kagoshima Jitsugyō High School, and batted 4th in his 1st year. From his third year onwards, he doubled as a pitcher, and with a fastball that surpassed 140 km/h, became the school's ace. Unfortunately, his team always got eliminated during the prefectural tournament. He recorded a total of 29 home runs during his high school career.

Hanshin Tigers
He was the Tiger's 2nd pick in the 2013 Nippon Professional Baseball draft. He inherited Shinjiro Hiyama's former jersey number, 24.

Playing Style
His physical prowess is highly praised, and even likened to that of Yoshio Itoi's, earning him the moniker "Itoi junior". He employs solid batting techniques, and has also been known to have a good sense for the ball. Not only does he possess an arm strength worthy of a pitcher, his speed (6.1 seconds for a 50-meter dash) is also one of his better selling points.

References

External links

 NPB stats

1995 births
Living people
Baseball people from Kagoshima Prefecture
Nippon Professional Baseball outfielders
Japanese baseball players
Hanshin Tigers players